is a former Japanese football player and manager. His brother Katsuyoshi Kuwahara is also former footballer.

Playing career
Kuwahara was born in Fujieda on May 5, 1948. After graduating from high school, he played for Furukawa Electric from 1967 to 1982.

Coaching career
In 1979, player Kuwahara also became an assistant coach at Furukawa Electric and he left the club in 1983. He managed Japan Football League club PJM Futures from 1993 to 1994. He moved to J1 League club Júbilo Iwata in 1996 and he became assistant coach under manager Luiz Felipe Scolari in 1997. In July 1997, Scolari resigned. However, the club could not find a successor. So, Kuwahara managed the club as assistant coach (He could not become a manager because he didn't have a coaching license for J1 League manager). He led the club to won the champion. In 1998, he got a license for J1 League manager and he became manager in 1999. In 1999, he led the club to won the champion again. In 2004, he came back as manager, but in September he resigned and he left the club. In 2008, he signed with Yokohama F. Marinos, but in June he resigned. He was elected AFC Coach of the Year in 1998.

Managerial statistics

Honours as manager
 J1 League - 1997, 1999
 Japanese Super Cup - 2004
 Asian Club Championship - 1999
 Asian Super Cup - 1999

References

External links

1948 births
Living people
Association football people from Shizuoka Prefecture
Japanese footballers
Japan Soccer League players
JEF United Chiba players
Japanese football managers
Júbilo Iwata managers
J1 League managers
Yokohama F. Marinos managers
Sportspeople from Shizuoka Prefecture
Association football midfielders
People from Fujieda, Shizuoka